Marthanda Varma Bridge is a bridge in Aluva, in Kochi city in Kerala, India. The bridge lies on the NH 47 Highway and connects the banks of the Periyar river in Aluva. This bridge was opened on 14 June 1940. Bridge across the Periyar river built in memory of His Highness Marthanda Varma Maharaja of Travancore, Marthanda Varma Ilayaraja submitted to the land. But the bridge was built by Chithirathirunal Balarama Varma. There is an insignia of the Travancore kingdom on the top of this bridge. Historically, the bridge served as a connection route between nearby kingdoms.

A new bridge was built parallel to the old bridge to increase the traffic capabilities to four lanes in 2002, and opened to the public on 23 June. The new bridge was opened to the public on 23 June 2002.

Gallery

See also
Aluva
Mangalapuzha bridge

References

Buildings and structures in Ernakulam district
Bridges completed in 1942
Bridges in Kerala
Transport in Ernakulam district
1942 establishments in India
20th-century architecture in India